Glenn Kessler (born July 6, 1959) is an American former diplomatic correspondent who has helmed the "Fact Checker" feature for The Washington Post since 2011.

Career
Kessler is a 1981 graduate of Brown University and received a Masters of International Affairs in 1983 from the School of International and Public Affairs at Columbia University.

Kessler is a member of the Council on Foreign Relations and the author of The Confidante: Condoleezza Rice and the Creation of the Bush Legacy.

Kessler's reporting played a role in two foreign policy controversies during the presidency of George W. Bush. He was called to testify in the trial of I. Lewis "Scooter" Libby, in which he was questioned about a 2003 telephone conversation with Libby in which the name of Valerie Plame, a CIA operative, might have been discussed.  (Libby recalled they had discussed Plame; Kessler said they did not.) Meanwhile, a 2004 telephone conversation between Kessler and Steve J. Rosen, a senior official at American Israel Public Affairs Committee (AIPAC), was at the core of the AIPAC leaking case.
The federal government recorded the call and made it the centerpiece of its 2005 indictment of Rosen and an alleged co-conspirator; the charges were dropped in 2009.

Kessler, a specialist on nuclear proliferation (especially in Iran and North Korea) and the Middle East, wrote the first article on the North Korea nuclear facility being built in Syria that was destroyed by Israeli jets. He was immediately attacked for spreading neoconservative propaganda but his reporting turned out to be correct and apologies were later offered. In a lengthy article, Kessler also revealed the Bush administration's internal decision-making that led to the Iraq war.  He traveled with three different Secretaries of State – Colin Powell, Condoleezza Rice and Hillary Clinton – and for several years wrote a blog about his experiences on those trips. An article he wrote on apparent tensions between Rice and Defense Secretary Donald Rumsfeld during a 2006 trip to Iraq was later denounced by Rumsfeld as "just fairly typical Washington Post stuff."

Kessler joined The Washington Post in 1998 as the national business editor and later served as economic policy reporter. Kessler also was a reporter with Newsday for eleven years, covering the White House, politics, the United States Congress, airline safety and Wall Street. Kessler’s investigative articles on airline safety for Newsday in the early 1990s prompted congressional hearings into safety issues and spurred the federal government to impose new safety rules for DC-9 jets and begin regular inspections of foreign airlines. His examination of the government’s failure to recognize that DC-9-10 jets were susceptible to stalling in icy conditions won the Premier Award from the Aviation/Space Writers Association. 

At Newsday, Kessler shared in two Pulitzer Prizes given for spot news reporting.

Washington Post Fact Checker
In the Washington Post "Fact Checker," Kessler rates statements by politicians, usually on a range of one to four Pinocchios – with one Pinocchio for minor shading of the facts and four Pinocchios for outright lies. If the statement is truthful, the person will get a rare "Geppetto." Kessler has a new fact check at least five times a week; one column appears every week in the Sunday print edition of The Washington Post. Kessler's team includes another reporter and a video producer, who also write fact checks edited by Kessler.

Kessler, who took charge of the Fact Checker feature in January 2011, is considered one of the pioneers in political fact checking, a movement that inspired nearly 300 fact-checking organizations in 83 countries, according to a tally by the Duke Reporters’ Lab. In 1996, while at Newsday, "Kessler wrote what may have been the first lengthy fact-check story in a major American newspaper, a preemptive guide to a debate between Bill Clinton and Bob Dole aimed at helping viewers evaluate the claims they were about to hear." He documented the growth of fact checking around the world in an article for Foreign Affairs magazine, written after training journalists in Morocco.

A columnist for The Wall Street Journal attacked the whole idea of awarding Pinocchios as akin to movie-reviewing, saying "the ‘fact check’ is opinion journalism or criticism, masquerading as straight news." The conservative Power Line political blog devoted three articles to critiquing one of Kessler’s articles, calling him a "liberal reporter",  and asserting that "these 'fact-checkers' nearly always turn out to be liberal apologists who don a false mantle of objectivity in order to advance the cause of the Democratic Party." Kessler's awarding of Four Pinocchios to GOP presidential candidate Herman Cain for comments he made on Margaret Sanger and the founding of Planned Parenthood was also criticized by opponents of abortion. Yet Power Line also said that Kessler's extensive review of Democratic charges that Romney was a "flip-flopper" turned out to be "admirably fair-minded."

The liberal blog Talking Points Memo took Kessler to task for giving Four Pinocchios to a Democratic web petition on Medicare, saying the errors he allegedly made "were not just small misses, but big belly flop misses." The Obama White House issued a statement titled "Fact Checking the Fact Checker" after Kessler gave Obama Three Pinocchios for statements he made on the auto industry bailout. The Democratic National Committee released a statement denouncing "Kessler’s hyperbolic, over the top fact check of the DNC’s assertion that Mitt Romney supports private Social Security accounts."

In 2013, Kessler launched an iOS app, titled GlennKessler for iOS, for his column on the App Store. The app was created by his son, Hugo Kessler. It contained his newest articles and general biographical information. The app was updated with a new design for iOS 7 in the fall of 2013. In 2014, he released a redesigned version of the app for the iPad and added a Pinocchio Game based on his column and a multitude of video interviews.

During the 2016 presidential campaign, the comic strip Doonesbury highlighted the vast disparity in Pinocchios given to Donald Trump versus Clinton. Kessler also appeared in a segment of The Daily Show about fact-checking Trump. "In terms of fact checking, Hillary Clinton is like playing chess with a real pro," he told Jordan Klepper. "Fact-checking Donald Trump is like playing checkers, with somebody who’s not very good at it. It’s pretty boring. His facts are so easily disproved there’s no joy in hunt."

Database of false or misleading Trump claims 

Shortly after Trump became President, Kessler announced a 100-day project to list every false and misleading statement made by Trump while in office. Kessler's team counted 492 untruths in the first 100 days, or an average of 4.9 per day. In response to reader requests, Kessler decided to keep it going for Trump's first year and then his entire presidency. By January 20, 2021, the end of Trump's four-year term, Kessler and his colleagues had counted 30,573 untruths, or an average of 21 a day. "Trump averaged about six claims a day in his first year as president, 16 claims day in his second year, 22 claims day in his third year – and 39 claims a day in his final year." Kessler wrote. "Put another way, it took him 27 months to reach 10,000 claims and another 14 months to reach 20,000. He then exceeded the 30,000 mark less than five months later." The database has drawn nationwide attention and been the subject of research by academicians. "Kessler is doing the poet’s work. Honor him," wrote New York Times columnist Roger Cohen. "The database he compiles with his colleagues Salvador Rizzo and Meg Kelly, listing every one of Trump’s untruths, will become a reference, a talisman."

Because of the Trump database, Kessler and the Fact Checker Team were nominated in 2020 by the Arthur L. Carter Journalism Institute at New York University for inclusion in a list of the Top Ten Works of Journalism of the Decade. “A rigorously reported and continually updated list of false statements by the president, numbering more than 19,000 by June 2020. The project is a sterling example of what journalists should do – holding the powerful accountable by using reporting and facts,” the nomination said. Kessler and his team in 2018 were also nominated by The Washington Post for a Pulitzer Prize.

The Washington Post on April 22, 2020 announced that Kessler and his team had written a book, "Donald Trump and His Assault on Truth: The President's Falsehoods, Misleading Claims and Flat-Out Lies," to be published June 2 by Scribner. "More than a catalogue of false claims, Donald Trump and His Assault on Truth is a necessary guide to understanding the motives behind the president’s falsehoods," the announcement said. Kirkus Reviews, in a starred review, called the book "an extremely valuable chronicle." The book appeared on Publisher Weekly's top ten best-seller list.

Kessler created a database of Joe Biden's false or misleading claims, but only for the first 100 days of his presidency. "I have learned my lesson," Kessler tweeted. "'Learned my lesson' means who knows what the next four years will bring. We have fact-checked Biden rigorously and will continue to do so. Trump at 500 claims/100 days was manageable; 8,000+ was not."

Claim about definition of the word "millions" 
Kessler has been criticized "for applying bizarrely specific standards to statements and sometimes calling obviously true statements 'misleading' if he doesn’t like what they imply."  For example, when Bernie Sanders said that “millions” of Americans were working more than one job, Kessler cited Bureau of Labor Statistics data showing that nearly 8 million people held more than one job, but rated Sanders’s statement as "misleading" because these 8 million people were just 5 percent of Americans with jobs. (Kessler responded to the criticism: "Since there was some Twitter outrage about this assessment, please note that this is a summary of a previous fact check, in which we said Sanders had the 'most accurate sound bite' on this issue among Democrats running for president." He then provided a link to the original column.)

Fact checks examining biographical claims 

Kessler has conducted a number of fact checks that examined biographical claims. He revealed in 2018 that House Republican leader Kevin McCarthy’s claim of being a small-business entrepreneur — “my own deli” — was exaggerated; McCarthy only had a counter in his uncle’s yogurt shop for a year. Kessler wrote many fact checks of claims that President Joe Biden made about his life, including whether he was arrested trying to see Nelson Mandela or arrested while advocating for civil rights.

Some of Kessler’s biographical fact checks have been criticized by their subjects. Rev. Robert W. Lee IV had stated In The Washington Post, in a lawsuit and at public events that he was a great-great-great-great nephew of Robert E. Lee, but in 2021 Kessler said a review of historical and genealogical records found there is “no evidence that Rob Lee, who was born in North Carolina, is related to Robert E. Lee.” Kessler traced Lee’s roots to a confederate soldier in Alabama called Robert S. Lee. In response, Lee said he had withdrawn from the lawsuit. But 8 months later Rob Lee said a 400-page family genealogy report gathered by a hired genealogist had found ties to Lee. The Washington Post said he declined to provide a copy of the report for examination by the newspaper. 

Also in 2021, Kessler said he had examined property and census records regarding the family of Sen. Tim Scott of South Carolina, discovering that Scott’s great-grandfather was a substantial landowner. “Scott tells a tidy story packaged for political consumption, but a close look shows how some of his family’s early and improbable success gets flattened and written out of his biography,” Kessler wrote. “Against heavy odds, Scott’s ancestors amassed relatively large areas of farmland, a mark of distinction in the Black community at the time.” 

Scott denounced the article, referring to it in his response to President Biden’s address to Congress that “a national newspaper suggested my family's poverty was actually privilege because a relative owned land generations before my time.” Other commentators also criticized the report. “I was really surprised by the intensity of the reaction, much of which was fanned by Fox News,” Kessler said in an interview with National Public Radio. “Not in any way did I ever suggest in the piece that Scott's great-grandfather lived a privileged life. I mean, after all, this is the Jim Crow South we're talking about.”

Controversies

Fact check about abortion 
In July 2022, Kessler was criticized for calling into question, with little evidence, a report of an abortion by a 10-year-old child from Ohio.  The report was later exhaustively confirmed by reporters and public records requests.  “The intent of the piece was to spotlight the need for careful reporting in a time when information spreads rapidly," Washington Post spokeswoman Shani George told the Associated Press.

In his article, Kessler wrote that, "None of the officials we reached were aware of such a case in their areas."  A subsequent Freedom of Information Act request revealed an email exchange between Kessler and officials at Children Services for Franklin County, where the alleged assault occurred in which the FCCS replied, "Their agency could not comment on specific cases, because this information is treated as confidential under Ohio law." In a correction, The Washington Post said "an email the county spokeswoman sent was inadvertently missed during the reporting."

Bernie Sanders fact checks 

In August 2018, Kessler came under fire for his coverage of a Mercatus Center study on the perceived costs of Senator Bernie Sanders's Medicare for All plan. Kessler released corrections to his fact check, which stated the Sanders's claims of $2.1 trillion in 10-year National Health Expenditure savings were cherry-picked. Kessler did not change his Three-Pinocchio rating and his findings were affirmed by other fact-checking organizations, including PolitiFact, FactCheck.org and the Associated Press.

In February 2021, Kessler was criticized by socialist magazine Jacobin for an article he wrote in which he rated a statement by Senator Bernie Sanders, in which Sanders had declared that the Tax Cuts and Jobs Act of 2017 had only benefited the wealthy, as three pinocchios. Jacobin criticized Kessler for what they perceived as him ignoring data in his article, and accused him of writing it in order to benefit Amazon CEO Jeff Bezos, who owns The Washington Post.

Awards and honors
 S.I. Newhouse School of Public Communications at Syracuse University's Toner Prize for Excellence in Political Reporting, Honorable Mention (2019) – Kessler and the Washington Post Fact Checker team were honored for the Fact Checker's database of Trump's misleading claims; the judges praised fact checks that are "clear, deliberate and never hyperbolic."
 National Association for Media Literacy Education's Media Literate Media award (2015) – received the award, which honors achieves in media literacy education or media literacy, for his work on "The Fact Checker."
 After addressing the Kentucky legislature in 2019 on behalf of its ethics commission, Kessler was named a Kentucky Colonel, the state's highest honor, for his contributions to the nation. Kessler noted on Twitter that he had awarded Four Pinocchios to the two people who had signed the declaration: Gov. Matt Bevin and Secretary of State Alison Lundergan Grimes.

Personal life
Kessler lives in McLean, Virginia, with his wife, Cynthia Rich. They have three children, Andre, Hugo, and Mara.

Kessler is a great-grandson of Jean Baptiste August Kessler, an oil industrialist, and a grandson of Geldolph Adriaan Kessler, who helped create the Dutch steel industry. He was born in Cincinnati, where his father, Adriaan Kessler, was an executive at Procter & Gamble, and he attended high school there and in Lexington, Kentucky. Kessler's mother, Else Bolotin, was a psychologist who in Lexington "helped women in that era of feminist awakening confront a society dominated by men." Both of his parents were Dutch, and immigrated to the United States after marriage.

Books
 The Confidante: Condoleezza Rice and the Creation of the Bush Legacy New York : Saint Martin's Press, 2007. 
 Donald Trump and His Assault on Truth: The President's Falsehoods, Misleading Claims and Flat-Out Lies New York : Scribner, 2020.

References

Sources

External links

 Glenn Kessler's official website
 Glenn Kessler's official app
 Glenn Kessler's "The Fact Checker" column
 Washington Post articles by Glenn Kessler
 

1959 births
Living people
American male journalists
The Washington Post people
Brown University alumni
School of International and Public Affairs, Columbia University alumni
People from McLean, Virginia
American newspaper reporters and correspondents
American people of Dutch descent
Kessler family